Maillezais is a commune in the Vendée department in the Pays de la Loire region in western France.

It was once an island in the Marais Poitevin, until monks of the Maillezais Abbey dug canals in the 13th century. Remains of the sea wall are still present, and canoe tours of the canals are a regular attraction to tourists. The ruins of the former Maillezais Abbey, dating from the 11th-14th century, are a listed monument.

See also
Communes of the Vendée department

References

Communes of Vendée